Shirley Temple's Storybook is a 1958-1961 American children's anthology series hosted and narrated by actress Shirley Temple. The series features adaptations of fairy tales like Mother Goose and other family-oriented stories performed by well-known actors, although one episode, an adaptation of Nathaniel Hawthorne's 1851 novel The House of the Seven Gables, was meant for older youngsters.

The first season of sixteen black-and-white and colored episodes aired on NBC between January 12, 1958 and December 21, 1958 as Shirley Temple's Storybook. Thirteen episodes of the first season re-ran on ABC beginning on January 12, 1959. The second season of twenty-five color episodes aired on NBC as The Shirley Temple Show between September 18, 1960 and July 16, 1961 in much the same format.

Episode list

Season 1

C^ Episode was telecast in color.
L^ Live episode.

Season 2

Book collections
Random House published three fairy tale collections under Temple's name based on the first season: Shirley Temple's Storybook (the complete season, except for "Hiawatha" and "Mother Goose," and including one additional story, "The Valiant Little Tailor"), Shirley Temple's Fairyland (selections from the first season), and Shirley Temple's Stories That Never Grow Old (selections from the first season).  A fourth book, Shirley Temple's Favorite Tales Of Long Ago (illustrated and published by Random House in 1958) includes "The Magic Fishbone", "The Nightingale", "The Valiant Little Tailor", and "The Little Lame Prince".

Home media
The full series anthology has not been released, however selected episodes of the second season were released on Region 1 DVD in 2006.  First Run Video released all sixteen of the first season episodes, all in black and white, on VHS tapes in 1989. Wood Knapp Video re-released thirteen of the episodes from the first season in extended play speed on VHS tape. The episodes were "Ali Baba and the Forty Thieves", "Hiawatha", "The Land of Green Ginger", "The Magic Fishbone", "The Nightingale", "Rapunzel", "The Emperor's New Clothes", "The Little Lame Prince", "Mother Goose", "Rip Van Winkle", "The Sleeping Beauty", "The Wild Swans", and "Dick Wittington and His Cat".

Award nomination

References

External links

Shirley Temple's Storybook at CVTA

1958 American television series debuts
1961 American television series endings
1950s American children's television series
1960s American children's television series
1950s American anthology television series
1960s American anthology television series
American children's fantasy television series
Black-and-white American television shows
English-language television shows
NBC original programming
Television about magic
Television series by Sony Pictures Television
Television shows based on fairy tales
Shirley Temple